Tesla (stylized as TESLA) is a Czech brand of electronic appliances. The name was originally used by a state-owned conglomerate that was the monopoly producer of electronic appliances and components in the former Socialist Republic of Czechoslovakia. The conglomerate was founded in 1946 and ran until 1991, when it was privatised. The Tesla name is used by its successor company and former subsidiaries in the Czech Republic and Slovakia.

Company

The company was established as Elektra on 18 January 1921 and renamed Tesla on 7 March 1946. A founding ceremony took place on 10 August 1946 at the Mikrofon Factory in Strašnice attended by government ministers from Czechoslovakia, Yugoslavia and Macedonia.

Tesla had several production locations, including those at Liptovský Hrádok, Hradec Králové, Pardubice, Žďár nad Sázavou, Bratislava, and Nižná. Some of them became independent state-owned companies. 

After the fall of communism in Czechoslovakia, Tesla struggled to compete with firms at home and abroad, which resulted in dramatic downsizing and privatization of the majority of its stores and production facilities. Tesla's logo is a rare sight in the present-day Czech Republic and Slovakia, as only a few of its subsidiaries have survived. One of its former subsidiaries, the Slovak JJ Electronic in Čadca is known for its production of vacuum tubes and SEV Litovel produces high-end turntables for the Austrian Pro-Ject company.

The company name survived as Tesla a.s., a private company whose shares trade on the Prague stock exchange. Tesla a.s. manufactures of radio and security equipment for military and commercial use. Tesla a.s. took a series of legal cases against the American company Tesla, Inc. (formerly Tesla Motors, Inc.), resulting in an agreement in October 2010, establishing a coexistence of Tesla trademarks and regulating relationships between the two companies. 

After a three year period in which an Irish-owned financial company was the majority shareholder in Tesla a.s. a controlling interest was acquired by Inter-Sat Ltd of Brno in 2011. Tesla a.s. sells set-top boxes, antennas, robotic vacuum cleaners, soundbars, motion detectors and multifunctional pressure cookers. In 2015 the company added batteries for home and industrial use to its product range.

Products
The original Tesla concern developed a wide product range including televisions, radio receivers, transistors, integrated circuits, visual display units, loudspeakers, gramophones, cassette decks, Compact Disc players and videocassette recorders. However, the quantity produced was often insufficient for industrial customers and some products became obsolete because they were not updated; e.g. one particular type of diode was manufactured for over 30 years without modification. Some products were comparable with those from international producers  e.g. silicon controlled rectifiers (SCRs) or power transistors and Tesla exported them to other countries in Eastern Europe. A few products were exported to western countries, for example, the NC 470 turntable rebranded as the NAD 5120, and the NC 450, NC 452, NC 430 turntables sold under the tradename Lenco.

In 1953, the production of the first Czechoslovak television, the Tesla 4001A,  began in Strašnice. The first Czechoslovak color television, the Tesla 4401A, began manufacturing in 1974.

The best-known Tesla products internationally were the 308U Talisman bakelite radio designed by Igor Didov of Tesla Bratislava and made by several Tesla company branches between 1953 and 1958 and the Sonet duo reel-to-reel tape recorder (1959-1965). Tesla was also known for its KRTP-86 Tamara military passive radar (TESLA Pardubice, 1986), which was claimed to be the only one in the world able to detect stealth aircraft.

Gallery

References

External links 

Former TESLA companies with new name:
 JJ Electronic
 SEV Litovel 
 Krystaly, Hradec Králové
 ON Semiconductor Czech Republic

Some of the companies now using the brand TESLA:
 Tesla Hloubětín (in Prague)
 Tesla Liptovský Hrádok
 Tesla Stropkov
 Tesla Pardubice
 Tesla Jihlava
 Tesla Karlín (in Prague)
 Tesla Blatná
 Tesla ElectronTubes Vršovice

Electronics companies of Czechoslovakia
Manufacturing companies based in Prague
Companies established in 1921